James Freeman (February 20, 1891 – July 16, 1951) was an American cyclist. He competed in two events at the 1920 Summer Olympics.

References

External links
 

1891 births
1951 deaths
American male cyclists
Olympic cyclists of the United States
Cyclists at the 1920 Summer Olympics
Sportspeople from Little Rock, Arkansas
Sportspeople from Arkansas